Live in Japan 1984 is a live album by guitarist Allan Holdsworth that was released by Manifesto Records in 2018.

The first thousand copies of this CD were released with a DVD of the performance filmed for Japanese television, which also includes clips of an interview with Holdsworth. This was originally released as Allan Holdsworth in Japan – Tokyo Dream on LaserDisc in 1984 by Toei Video.

Reception
All About Jazz awarded the album with 4.5 out of 5 stars. The review by John Kelman states: "With wonderfully remastered audio and, for those first thousand, a revelatory video as well, the official release of Live in Japan 1984 may well be long overdue".

Track listing

Personnel
Allan Holdsworth – guitar
Paul Williams – vocals
Chad Wackerman – drums
Jimmy Johnson – bass
Technical
Gordon "Gordy" Davis – engineer
Bill Inglot, Dave Schultz – remastering

References

Allan Holdsworth albums
2018 live albums